Sylane GAA is a Gaelic Athletic Association club located in Sylaun, County Galway, Ireland. The club is primarily concerned with the game of hurling.

History

Located in the townland of Sylaun, just outside Tuam, County Galway, Sylane GAA Club was founded in 1984. The club has spent most of its existence operating in the junior grade, however, as of 2023, Sylane compete in the Galway IHC. The club has won Connacht JCHC titles in 2007, 2015 and 2017. A sister camogie club was established in 2008.

Honours

Connacht Junior Club Hurling Championship (3): 2007, 2015, 2017

References

External link

 Sylane Hurling and Campgie Club website

Gaelic games clubs in County Galway
Hurling clubs in County Galway